Out of Myself is the first full-length album by progressive rock/metal band Riverside released on 21 September 2004. It was first released under The Laser's Edge  and is the first album in the boxed set Reality Dream Trilogy which includes Out of Myself, Second Life Syndrome and Rapid Eye Movement.

Acclaim and reviews 
Riverside's debut full album Out of Myself was met with critical acclaim among progressive rock and metal reviewers. The album was described as "a rare thing of beauty" by MetalCrypt reviewer Bruce Dragonchaser. Boris at Metal Reviews stated that he was "lucky" to have "stumbled" on the album. "...one of the most treasured pieces in my collection", noted Ivor at Metal Storm.

Album style 
Out of Myself  has been described as an "emotional musical journey", "powerful in a subtle way", with "slight elements of metal, arena rock, grunge, and even dub." At the same time, the album has been termed "the band's gentle first outing." Built on the strength of Mariusz Duda's bass guitar, the music also relies on a soaring atmosphere of Jacek Melnicki's keyboards  and "long, weeping, long stretched high guitar notes" of Piotr Grudziński's lead guitar.

Track listing

Personnel

Riverside
Mariusz Duda – vocals, bass, acoustic guitar
Piotr Grudziński – lead and rhythm guitars
Jacek Melnicki – keyboards
Piotr Kozieradzki – drums, percussion

Additional musicians
With Krzysztof Melnicki: Trombone on "OK"

Production
Arranged and produced by Riverside
Recorded and engineered by Jacek Melnicki
Mixed by Robert and Magda Srzednicki 
Mastered by Grzegorz Piwkowski

Charts

References

2003 debut albums
2004 albums
Riverside (band) albums
Concept albums
Albums with cover art by Travis Smith (artist)